Antônio Bento da Silva Filho (born September 7, 1967, in Rio de Janeiro), known as Toni Garrido, is a Brazilian singer, TV presenter and actor. He is the lead singer of the reggae band Cidade Negra.

Born in a poor background, Garrido was adopted by the owner of the middle class apartment in Copacabana where his biological mother used to work as a maid. Garrido started playing guitar during church services, and after positive feedback he decided to pursue a musical career. He joined three friends and formed the (now extinct) Banda Bel. But in 1994 he was invited to join Cidade Negra as the lead singer. They became one of the most successful bands in Brazil, merging reggae, soul and pop rock.  In 2008 Garrido decided to pursue a solo career, but rejoined Cidade Negra at the end of 2010.

Garrido is the lead actor in Orfeu, a 1999 Brazilian film by Carlos Diegues, and also sung the soundtrack.

References

External links

Brazilian singer-songwriters
Musicians from Rio de Janeiro (city)
1967 births
Sony BMG artists
Living people
Afro-Brazilian male actors
Afro-Brazilian male singers
Brazilian male singer-songwriters